Mohammed Al-Dhahri (Arabic:محمد الظاهري) (born 16 January 1991) is an Emirati footballer who plays for Al Diwaniya as a left back. He became the first Emirati player to play in the Iraqi Premier League when he signed for Al Diwaniya in September 2022.

External links

References

Emirati footballers
1991 births
Living people
Al Ain FC players
Al Wahda FC players
Al-Wasl F.C. players
Sharjah FC players
Fujairah FC players
Dibba FC players
Masfout Club players
Association football fullbacks
UAE Pro League players
UAE First Division League players
Al-Diwaniya FC players
Emirati expatriate sportspeople in Iraq
Expatriate footballers in Iraq
Iraqi Premier League players